Citricoccus zhacaiensis is a Gram-positive, neutrophilic, non-spore-forming and non-motile bacterium from the genus Citricoccus.

References

Bacteria described in 2010
Micrococcaceae